Todd Wash (born July 19, 1968) is an American football coach who is the defensive line coach for the Carolina Panthers of the National Football League (NFL). Before that, he was a defensive coach for the Detroit Lions, Jacksonville Jaguars, Seattle Seahawks and Tampa Bay Buccaneers and has served as a head coach at Fort Lewis College.

Head coaching record

References

1968 births
Living people
Fort Lewis Skyhawks football coaches
Jacksonville Jaguars coaches
Missouri Southern Lions football coaches
National Football League defensive coordinators
Nebraska–Kearney Lopers football coaches
North Dakota State Bison football coaches
North Dakota State Bison football players
Seattle Seahawks coaches
Tampa Bay Buccaneers coaches
Detroit Lions coaches
Carolina Panthers coaches